Raja Gopi Mohan Tagore (1760–1819) was scion of the Pathuriaghata Tagore family and noted zamindar and philanthropist from Bengal region of the Indian subcontinent.

He was son of Darpanarayan Tagore, who branched and founded Pathuriaghata branch of Tagore family. He knew Sanskrit, French, Portuguese, English, Persian and Urdu languages. Gopi Mohan Tagore was well known for his wealth and in 1812, made what may be the largest ever gift of gold to the Kali temple at Kalighat. He was one of the founders of Presidency College, Kolkata, the institution that initiated western education in the country. He was fluent in English, and familiar with French, Portuguese, Sanskrit, Persian and Urdu, apart from Bengali. His donation for founding of Presidency College later known as Hindu College was second largest, next only to Maharaja of Burdwan and a marble tablet was erected of him in Library Hall of College to commemorate it. He was later appointed Governor of Hindu College and instituted a scholarship in his name for the eligible students.

Goopi Mohan celebrated Durga Pujo with grandeur and many Europeans including General Wellesly attended the festival and dinner hosted by him.

He was a great patron of art, music, Sanskrit learning and athletic sports and used to donate generously for this purpose. The famous wrestler, Radha Gowla, was in his pay role. Among others in his pensioners were Lakhi Kanta, the noted Bengali lyricist and Kali Mirza, the noted singer of that time.

He was a close friend of Raja Raj Krishna Deb of Sovabazar Raj. He once assisted father of Raja Baroda Kanta Roy of Jessore.

He had begun the Tagore family's art collection with the assistance of the British artist George Chinnery, who had visited Calcutta in 1803., which was later expanded by his great-grandson, Prodyot Coomar Tagore. He was the founder of Shyamnagar Mulajore Kali Temple at Shyamnagar. He founded it in mid May 1802.

He had six sons and a daughter. Surji Kumar, Chandra Kumar, Nanda Kumar, Kali Kumar, Hara Kumar and Prassana Kumar., of which Hara Kumar Tagore and Prasanna Kumar Tagore both of whom carried forward legacy of Tagore family, were noted.

References

1760 births
1819 deaths
Bengali Hindus
18th-century Bengalis
People from Kolkata
Bengali zamindars
Gopi Mahan
18th-century Indian educators
Founders of Indian schools and colleges
Indian philanthropists
Social workers from West Bengal